Daniel Myers Van Auken (January 15, 1826 – November 7, 1908) was a Democratic member of the U.S. House of Representatives from Pennsylvania.

Daniel M. Van Auken was born in Montague Township, New Jersey.  He attended the common schools and Deckertown Academy.  He graduated from Union College in Schenectady, New York, in 1852.  He studied law, was admitted to the Pennsylvania bar in 1855 and commenced the practice of law in Milford, Pennsylvania.  He served as prosecuting attorney of Pike County, Pennsylvania, from 1855 to 1859.  Van Auken was the first Worshipful Master of the Milford Masonic Lodge, No. 344 (which was then No. 82) in Milford, PA from 1862 through 1864.

Van Auken was elected as a Democrat to the Fortieth and Forty-first Congresses.  He was not a candidate for reelection in 1870.  He resumed the practice of law in Milford and served as district attorney of Pike County from 1893 to 1896 and 1899 to 1903.  He continued the practice of law until his death in Milford in 1908.  Interment in Milford Cemetery.

Sources

The Political Graveyard

1826 births
1908 deaths
19th-century American politicians
Democratic Party members of the United States House of Representatives from Pennsylvania
County district attorneys in Pennsylvania
Pennsylvania lawyers
People from Milford, Pennsylvania
People from Montague Township, New Jersey
Union College (New York) alumni